The Book of Gold Leaves is a book by Mirza Waheed which was published in 2014 by Penguin Books.

Plot 
The Book of Gold Leaves is set in the 1990s where Kashmir was simmering because of rebellion and political strife. The book is about the story of two lovers Roohi and Faiz and how they met each other.

Critical reception 
Alice Albinia of Financial Times wrote "Waheed's second, new novel, The Book of Gold Leaves, is, aesthetically, a very different book", Kashoo Tawseef of Countercurrents.org wrote "The art of story telling and flow of writing has very well crafted by the author and makes you feel that you are among the characters of the novel." Iram Shafi Allaie of The Criterion wrote "The plot of the The Book of Gold Leaves is clear and the language is simple." and "The Book of Gold Leaves has been received very warmly by critics." Mahvesh Murad of Dawn wrote "The Collaborator was also a beautiful, emotional and lyrical novel and The Book of Gold Leaves is even more so, almost to the point of being indulgent." Chitra Ramaswamy of The Guardian wrote "The effect of this tense novel is cumulative."

Mary Ann Pickford of The Northern Echo gave 6 out of 10 stars.

The book has been also reviewed by Deepa Dharmadhikari of Live Mint, Gargi Gupta of Daily News and Analysis, and Shah Khalid of Daily Times.

References 

2014 books
Penguin Books books